The Mad Russian may refer to:

Bert Gordon (comedian) (1895–1974), American radio comedian who originated "The Mad Russian" character
Lou Novikoff (1915–1970), American baseball player
Steve Rachunok (1916–2002), American baseball player
Bill Vukovich (1918–1955), American automobile racing driver
Alexis Smirnoff (born 1947), Canadian professional wrestler
Sam Ermolenko (born 1960), American motorcycle speedway rider